Arthur Blackburn (1876–1938) was an English footballer who played as a full-back with Blackburn Rovers and Southampton around the turn of the 20th century. He was the elder brother of England international footballer, Fred Blackburn.

Football career
Blackburn was born in the village of Billington, Lancashire and first joined his local club, Blackburn Rovers, in March 1895. After three years of reserve-team football, he spent the 1898–99 season with Northamptonshire club Wellingborough playing in the Midland League.

He returned to Blackburn in the summer of 1899; by now his brother Fred had become established at outside-left. Arthur once again spent most of his time at Ewood Park playing in Rovers' reserve team while keeping fit by voluntarily working on the renovation of a church, and only managed two first-team appearances in the 1899–1900 season.

In May 1900, Blackburn was persuaded to move to the south coast to join Southampton in the Southern League. Blackburn Rovers were reluctant to part company with him, but the financial inducements offered by Southampton persuaded him to try his luck in the south. Described as "strongly built", Blackburn "never gave less than 100%, but at time his play was too impetuous to be reliable". He made his "Saints"  debut at right-back in the opening match of the 1900–01 season, a 4–3 victory at Luton Town and played in nine of the first ten games of the season until a serious ankle injury put him out of the side, with Bertram Sharp taking over. 
 
Blackburn was unable to regain his place and in the summer of 1901 he returned to his home-town club where he made two further appearances in the 1901–02 season.

Later career
Blackburn is known to have coached subsequently in Rotterdam in the Netherlands, before returning to Blackburn, where he ran a retail tobacconist shop.

References

1876 births
1938 deaths
Footballers from Blackburn
English footballers
English Football League players
Southern Football League players
Blackburn Rovers F.C. players
Wellingborough Town F.C. players
Southampton F.C. players
Association football fullbacks